The 1952 Arizona Wildcats football team represented the University of Arizona in the Border Conference during the 1952 college football season.  In their first season under head coach Warren B. Woodson, the Wildcats compiled a 6–4 record (3–2 against Border opponents) and outscored their opponents, 285 to 155. The team captains were Jim Donarski and Dick Christiansen.  The team played its home games in Arizona Stadium in Tucson, Arizona.

Schedule

References

Arizona
Arizona Wildcats football seasons
Arizona Wildcats football